Elm Creek is a census-designated place (CDP) in Maverick County, Texas, United States. The population was 2,469 at the 2010 census.

Geography
Elm Creek is located at  (28.773525, -100.490801).

Demographics
As of the census of 2010,  2,469 people, 462 households, and 437 families resided there. The population density was 682.8 people per square mile (264.0/km2). The 519 housing units averaged 183.8/sq mi (71.1/km2). The racial makeup of the CDP was 55.55% White, 0.10% African American, 0.57% Native American, 0.62% Pacific Islander, 41.23% from other races, and 1.92% from two or more races. Hispanics or Latinos of any race were 97.15% of the population.

Of the 462 households, out of which 70.1% had children under the age of 18 living with them, 79.4% were married couples living together, 13.4% had a female householder with no husband present, and 5.4% were not families. About 5.0% of all households were made up of individuals, and 1.7% had someone living alone who was 65 years of age or older. The average household size was 4.17 and the average family size was 4.31.

In the CDP, the population was distributed as 44.2% under the age of 18, 8.5% from 18 to 24, 29.3% from 25 to 44, 14.4% from 45 to 64, and 3.7% who were 65 years of age or older. The median age was 23 years. For every 100 females, there were 89.2 males. For every 100 females age 18 and over, there were 90.1 males.

The median income for a household in the CDP was $21,791, and for a family was $21,706. Males had a median income of $18,021 versus $11,500 for females. The per capita income was $6,300. About 36.5% of families and 40.8% of the population were below the poverty line, including 46.5% of those under age 18 and 11.5% of those age 65 or over.

Education
Elm Creek is served by the Eagle Pass Independent School District.

References

Census-designated places in Maverick County, Texas
Census-designated places in Texas